The South Florida Bulls women's basketball team represents the University of South Florida in women's basketball. The Bulls compete in the American Athletic Conference in Division I of the National Collegiate Athletic Association (NCAA). The Bulls play home basketball games at the Yuengling Center. South Florida is coached by Jose Fernandez, who has been with the Bulls since the 2000–01 season. USF has made the NCAA Division I women's basketball tournament seven times in their history (2006, 2013, 2015, 2016, 2017, 2018, and 2021) and won the Women's National Invitation Tournament in 2009. They have won three conference championships, taking the regular season American Athletic Conference title in 2021 and 2023 and the AAC tournament crown in 2021.

Season-by-season record
As of the 2021–22 season, the Bulls have a 711–699 record. They have made the NCAA Tournament eight times, along with nine appearances in the Women's National Invitation Tournament, including a title in 2009.

Postseason results

NCAA tournament 
The Bulls have made the NCAA Division I women's basketball tournament seven times in their history and have an overall record of 4–8.

WNIT 
The Bulls have made the Women's National Invitation Tournament 9 times. They have an overall record of 14–8 and won the tournament in 2009.

Awards and recognition

Players

All Americans 

 Jessica Dickson (Honorable Mention 2005–06)
 Jessica Dickson (Honorable Mention 2006–07)
 Andrea Smith (Honorable Mention 2012–13)
 Courtney Williams (Honorable Mention 2013–14)
 Courtney Williams (Honorable Mention 2014–15)
 Courtney Williams (Honorable Mention 2015–16)
 Kitija Laksa (Honorable Mention, 2016–17)
 Maria Jespersen (Honorable Mention, 2017–18)

WNIT Most Valuable Player 

 Shantia Grace (2009)

Conference Player of the Year 

 Wanda Guyton (Sun Belt, 1988–89)

First team all conference 

Wanda Guyton (Sun Belt, 1988–89)
 Angie Snyder (Sun Belt, 1990–91)
 Angie Snyder (Metro, 1991–92)
 Tammy van Oppen (Metro, 1993–94)
Jessica Dickson (Conference USA, 2004–05)
 Jessica Dickson (Big East, 2005–06)
 Jessica Dickson (Big East, 2006–07)
 Shantia Grace (Big East, 2008–09)
 Jessica Lawson (Big East, 2008–09)
 Andrea Smith (Big East, 2012–13)
Courtney Williams (American, 2013–14)
Courtney Williams (American, 2014–15)
Courtney Williams (American, 2015–16)
Kitija Laksa (American, 2016–17)
 Maria Jespersen (American, 2016–17)
 Maria Jespersen (American, 2017–18)
Bethy Mununga (American, 2020–21)
Elena Tsineke (American, 2020–21)

In the WNBA 

 Courtney Williams 
 Inga Orekhova
 Andrea Smith
 Jessica Dickson
 Wanda Guyton

USF Athletic Hall of Fame 

 Wanda Guyton (2009)
 Jessica Dickson (2012)
 Shantia Grace (2019)
Courtney Williams (2020)

Retired jerseys

Coaches

Conference Coach of the Year 

 Trudi Lacey (Sun Belt, 1988–89)
 Jose Fernandez (American, 2017–18)
Jose Fernandez (American, 2020–21)

Media 
Under the current American Athletic Conference TV deal, all home and in-conference away women's basketball games are shown on one of the various ESPN networks or streamed live on ESPN+. Live radio broadcasts of games are also available nationwide for free on the Bulls Unlimited digital radio station on TuneIn.

See also

 South Florida Bulls
 South Florida Bulls men's basketball

References

External links